Magnolia is a village in Putnam County, Illinois, United States. The population was 260 at the 2010 census. It is part of the Ottawa Micropolitan Statistical Area.

History

Magnolia is the oldest village in Putnam County, originally settled in the 1830s by William Hawes. Said to once have over 2,000 residents, the village now has approximately 300 citizens. Magnolia is most famous for its mushroom festival, which later moved to a larger city. This made room for the Magnolia days events that take place in August every year.

The high school building was constructed in 1912 and later demolished in 2006.  In 1964, Magnolia joined the newly created school district, Putnam County, which consolidated the school districts of Magnolia Swaney (communities of Magnolia and McNabb), Hennepin (town of Hennepin), and Hopkins Township High School (communities of Granville, Standard, and Mark).

At one time, the village had a bank, jail, grocery store and much more. The town is now occupied by a restaurant, tavern, consignment shop and several churches. Another long-standing social institution is the Magnolia Masonic Lodge. Magnolia has a long heritage of military tradition and strong following through the American Legion.

Geography

Demographics

As of the census of 2000, there were 279 people, 103 households, and 73 families residing in the village. The racial makeup of the village was 95.70% White, 2.51% African American, 1.08% Native American and 0.72% Asian. Hispanic or Latino of any race were 0.36% of the population.

There were 103 households, out of which 33.0% had children under the age of 18 living with them, 57.3% were married couples living together, 6.8% had a female householder with no husband present, and 28.2% were non-families. 22.3% of all households were made up of individuals, and 9.7% had someone living alone who was 65 years of age or older. The average household size was 2.71 and the average family size was 3.20.

In the village, the population was spread out, with 28.7% under the age of 18, 9.3% from 18 to 24, 24.4% from 25 to 44, 22.9% from 45 to 64, and 14.7% who were 65 years of age or older. The median age was 36 years. For every 100 females, there were 87.2 males. For every 100 females age 18 and over, there were 93.2 males.

The median income for a household in the village was $38,125, and the median income for a family was $45,625. Males had a median income of $36,250 versus $25,694 for females. The per capita income for the village was $13,909. About 2.9% of families and 11.1% of the population were below the poverty line, including 11.9% of those under the age of eighteen and 16.3% of those 65 or over.

Two families make up the majority of the villages populace.  The Smith family makes up approximately 50% of the population, while the Ringenberg family makes up approximately 10% of the population.  These percentages are expected to grow in upcoming years due to the larger than average harvest this year.

Economy
Magnolia is a predominantly agricultural community with no industry; the majority of employees work for local farmers, are union contractors, or travel to nearby towns for employment.

Notable people
Mildred Amanda Baker Bonham (1840-1907), traveler, journalist
Charles E. Mills (1867-1929), businessman
Victor Cicero Kays (1882–1966) American educator, coach and the founding president of Arkansas State University

References

Villages in Putnam County, Illinois
Ottawa, IL Micropolitan Statistical Area
Populated places established in the 1830s
1830s establishments in Illinois